Edward Baynard may refer to:

Edward Baynard (sheriff) (c. 1512–1575), English politician
Edward Baynard (physician) (1641–?), English physician and poet

See also
Baynard